When the Desert Calls is a 1922 American silent drama film directed by Ray C. Smallwood and starring Violet Heming, Robert Frazer and Huntley Gordon.

Cast
 Violet Heming as Louise Caldwell
 Robert Frazer as Eldred Caldwell / George Stevenson
 Sheldon Lewis as Richard Manners
 Huntley Gordon as 	Dr. Thorpe
 J. Barney Sherry as 	Lt. Col. Potter
 David Wall as 	Frank Warren, U.S. Consul
 Julia Swayne Gordon as 	The White Angel
 Nick Thompson as 	Nazim
 Tammany Young as British Tommy

References

Bibliography
 Connelly, Robert B. The Silents: Silent Feature Films, 1910-36, Volume 40, Issue 2. December Press, 1998.
 Munden, Kenneth White. The American Film Institute Catalog of Motion Pictures Produced in the United States, Part 1. University of California Press, 1997.

External links
 

1922 films
1922 drama films
1920s English-language films
American silent feature films
Silent American drama films
American black-and-white films
Films directed by Ray C. Smallwood
1920s American films